A cocktail is a mixed drink containing alcohol.

Cocktail may also refer to:

 Fruit cocktail, a mixture of various fruits, often canned
 Shrimp cocktail, also known as a prawn cocktail, a type of seafood cocktail
 Cocktail dress, a shorter length lady's gown
 Molotov cocktail, a crude incendiary weapon
 A mixture of drugs, especially a mixture of Antiretroviral drugs used to treat HIV sometimes called a "triple cocktail"
 A style of arcade cabinet where the screen lies horizontal and players generally sit opposite each other to play
 In scuba diving with a rebreather, slang for caustic liquid getting in circuit if water gets at its absorbent

Entertainment
 Cocktail (code name), the code name of Apple's iTunes LP music format
 Cocktail (magazine), a Swedish and Norwegian erotic magazine edited by Linda Johansen
 Cocktails (film), a 1928 British comedy film
 "Cocktails" (The Office), a 2007 episode of the television series The Office
 Cocktail (1988 film), an American film starring Tom Cruise
 Cocktail (2006 film), a Hong Kong film directed by Ching Long and Herman Yau
 Cocktail (2010 film), a Malayalam-language film starring Jayasurya and Samrvitha Sunil
 Cocktail (2012 film), a Hindi-language film starring Saif Ali Khan and Deepika Padukone
 Cocktail (2020 film), a Tamil-language comedy film starring Yogi Babu
 Cocktail (album), a 2003 album by the Mexican electronic pop band Belanova
 Cocktails (album), an album by Too Short
 "Cocktail" (song), 2018 song by D-Block Europe and Yxng Bane
 "Cocktails" (song), 2009 song by Hot Leg

See also
 The Coctails, spelled without a 'k,' a defunct Chicago jazz/lounge quartet
 Cocktail party (disambiguation)